Books to Prisoners is an umbrella term for organizations that mail free reading material to prison inmates.

Background

The first Books to Prisoners projects were founded in the early 1970s. These included Seattle's Books to Prisoners, Boston's Prison Book Program, and the Prison Library Project which was founded in Durham, NC, but relocated to Claremont, CA in 1986. Since then, dozens of prison book programs have been established, although many have had short life-spans. Currently there are more than fifty similar projects in the United States, Canada, and the United Kingdom. The groups communicate about common issues and solutions through a listserv created in 2006 and have held national and regional conferences, including a 2003 conference in Philadelphia, PA, a 2007 conference in Urbana-Champaign, IL, and a 2019 conference in Boston, MA. In keeping with the anarchist cultural roots of the concept, each group is autonomous though they frequently collaborate on common challenges, especially prison book restrictions and book bans. 

Books to Prisoners programs have a diverse range of political affiliations. Many groups identify as anarchist or abolitionist.  Others are nonpolitical and simply promote education and literacy. Some group serve specific populations and focus on gender, sexuality, or race.

Books to prisoners programs generally accept donations of books from publishers, bookstores, and individuals. During the COVID-19 pandemic, when processing donated books was impractical, many groups launched wish lists at independent bookstores where supporters could buy in-demand books which were later sent to prisoners. Each project solicits book requests from incarcerated people, usually by genre or by naming a preferred author. Often-requested materials include dictionaries, how-to books, educational books, and historical works, especially those focusing on African-American, Latino, and Native American history. Project volunteers or workers fill the requests by sending a few books taken from the project's library. There is no cost to book recipients.

Generally, volunteers answer letters, mail packages, and complete administrative work. Many of the projects are affiliated with a local independent bookstore in their home city, which provides a drop-off location for donations and sometimes a small supply of books as well. 

Prison book groups continuously struggle to fulfill their mission in the face of prison book bans, which constitute the largest area of book censorship in the United States. In 2018, Mississippi-based prison book group Big House Books sued the Mississippi Department of Corrections over an all-encompassing ban on non-religious books; the lawsuit was dropped after the Department of Corrections agreed to allow Big House Books to continue sending free books to Mississippi prisons. Also in 2018, the state of New York issued Directive 4911A in an attempt to restrict the books available to prisoners at three of its prisons; after public outcry and media attention, garnered in part through the efforts of New York City-based prison book group Books Through Bars, the directive was rescinded.  In 2019, the Washington Department of Corrections banned the shipment of used books directly to prisoners. After facing public criticism and pushback from Seattle Books to Prisoners, the Washington DOC partially backed down and allowed shipments from four BTP programs to continue.

References 

Books
Prison-related organizations
Organizations established in the 1970s